A bilateral aviation safety agreement (BASA) is an agreement that provides for civil aviation certifications to be shared between two countries.

The European Aviation Safety Agency (EASA) currently maintains BASAs with the FAA, the Transport Canada Civil Aviation (TCCA), the National Civil Aviation Agency of Brazil (ANAC), and the Civil Aviation Administration of China (CAAC).

The FAA has had a BASA with TCCA since 12 June 2000. This particular BASA has in Article 5 a sixty-day cancellation notice period.

The Civil Aviation Authority of the United Kingdom has had a BASA with the TCCA since 1 January 2021.

References

Civil aviation authorities
Federal Aviation Administration
Air traffic control in Europe
Aviation authorities
Aviation safety in Europe
Civil aviation authorities in Europe
Transport and the European Union
Civil aviation in Brazil
 
Canadian transport law
Department for Transport
Regulators of the United Kingdom
Civil aviation in the United Kingdom
Bilateral treaties of the United States
Bilateral treaties of Canada
Bilateral treaties of China
Bilateral treaties of the United Kingdom